Corteo Storico Matildico is a reminiscent event of historical nature, which takes place annually in Quattro Castella, in the province of Reggio Emilia, since 1955.

The Coronation 

The event takes place generally on the last Sunday in May and recalls the episode of the coronation of Matilda of Canossa at the hands of Henry V, occurred at the foot of the Castle of Bianello between 6 and 10 of May of the year 1111.

The Emperor was the son of Henry IV who, 30 years before, obtained from Pope Gregory VII, through the mediation of Matilde, the “forgiveness of Canossa”. Donizone from Canossa, Matilda’s biographer and chronicler of that time, says that the Emperor reached the Castle of Bianello when back from Rome and he crowned the Grand Duchess with the title of "Imperial Vicar Vice-Queen of Italy". This episode was the decisive step towards the Concordat of Worms. Historical sources report that the ceremony took place in the churchyard of the St Antonino Church, not far from where the event is currently taking place.

The Show 

The show is the theatrical re-enactment of the historical episode, with the figure of Matilda and of the Emperor Henry V, commonly interpreted  by known figures from the entertainment, culture and sport. The event has traditionally different medieval shows:

 The performances of the flag-wavers and musicians’ districts of Quattro Castella: (Contrada di Monticelli, Contrada della Corte, Contrada della Maestà della Battaglia)
 The parades and performances of the main historical groups of Quattro Castella: (Contrada di Borgoleto, Gruppo Storico dei Villici, Gruppo Storico Arcieri delle Quattro Castella)
 The Quintana Ring: it is a game of skill for knights. Participants must be able to fit with the spear while riding rings, which become gradually smaller.
 The “Gran Passo d’Armi”, otherwise known as "the Bridge Game" or "the Fight of the Bridge": Two teams of 7 fighters face in a duel over a wooden bridge. The team that manages to bring down all the members of the opposing team from the bridge, leaving at least one of its members still on, is the winner

 Curiosity 

Corteo Storico Matildico takes its name from the final parade (the translation of "parade" in Italian is "corteo") of more than 1.000 figures in the period costume, along the streets of Quattro Castella.

The event is currently organized by the Municipality of Quattro Castella, by a committee of volunteers known as the "Matildic Committee". In the editions prior to 1984 it was organized by the Pro Loco of Quattro Castella''.

The historical parade was interrupted only once in its history from 1972 to 1984, the year in which it has been restarted.

References

External links
 Castle of Bianello official site
 Corteo Storico official Site

1955 establishments in Italy
Recurring events established in 1955
Medieval reenactment
Annual events in Italy
Spring (season) events in Italy
Matilda of Tuscany
Henry V, Holy Roman Emperor